
Year 142 BC was a year of the pre-Julian Roman calendar. At the time it was known as the Year of the Consulship of Calvus and Servilianus (or, less frequently, year 612 Ab urbe condita). The denomination 142 BC for this year has been used since the early medieval period, when the Anno Domini calendar era became the prevalent method in Europe for naming years.

Events 
 By place 
 Syria 
 Diodotus Tryphon seizes the throne of the Seleucid Empire.

 Roman Republic 
 The first stone bridge over the Tiber river is completed.

 Judea 
 Simon Maccabaeus succeeds his brother Jonathan as High Priest of Judea until 135 BC.

Births 
 Ptolemy IX, Egyptian pharaoh (d. 81 BC)

References